The Rotzo Formation is a geological formation in Italy, dating to roughly between 189 and 183 million years ago and covering the Pliensbachian stage of the Jurassic Period in the Mesozoic Era. Has been traditionally classified as a Sinemurian-Pliensbachian Formation, but a large and detailed dataset of isotopic 13C and 87Sr/86Sr data, estimated the Rotzo Formation to span only over the whole Pliensbachian. The Rotzo Formation represented the Carbonate Platform, being located over the Trento Platform and surrounded by the Massone Oolite (marginal calcarenitic bodies), the Fanes Piccola Encrinite (condensed deposits and emerged lands), the Lombadian Basin Medolo Group and Belluno Basin Soverzene Formation (open marine), and finally towards the south, deep water deposits of the Adriatic Basin.

Fossil prosauropod tracks have been reported from the formation. This formation was deposited within a tropical lagoon environment which was protected by oolitic shoals and bars from the open deep sea located to the east (Belluno Basin) and towards the west (Lombardia Basin). It is characterized by a rich paleontological content. It is notable mostly thanks to its great amount of big aberrant bivalves, among which is the genus Lithiotis, described in the second half of the nineteenth century. The unusual shape of Lithiotis and Cochlearites shells, extremely elongated and narrow, characterized by a spoon-like body space placed in a high position, rarely preserved, seems to suggest their adaptation to soft and muddy bottoms with a high sedimentation rate. The Bellori outcrop displays about 20 m of limestones with intercalated clays and marls rich in organic matter and sometimes fossil wood (coal) and amber. The limestones are well stratified, with beds 10 cm to more than one metre thick, whereas the clayey levels range between 3 and 40 cm in thickness.



Invertebrata 
Microfossils of the Rotzo Formation consist of benthic foraminifera, calcareous algae, Ostracoda and coprolites. Foraminifera are mainly benthic agglutinated species belonging to the superfamily Lituolacea (suborder Textulariina), while lamellar and porcellaneous-walled species are very rare. The bivalve Opisoma excavatum is very common.

Ichnofossils
In the Western Venetian Prealps a shallow-water, oceanic carbonate platform system, the Trento platform, developed on the Early Jurassic, producing a large succession of massive to well-bedded white Limestones, several 100 m thick that are part of the Calcari Grigi Group, where the Rotzo Formation is the Upper Member. On the local limestone of the Rotzo Formation deep burrowing is a very common type of biogenic activity, as is shown due to the presence of a large characteristic network of burrows which reach down to the lagoonal, marly-clayey assigned strata, suggesting intense bioturbation by large unknown organisms, perhaps giant decapod crustaceans (Probably members of the family Erymidae), although, the burrows found are not closely related to the ones of Shrimps or other decapods, but resemble those of Stomatopoda and Malacostraca. Other includes abandoned burrows, vertical biogenic action and infilling on the sea substrate.

Bivalves
The Rotzo Formation is known mostly due to its massive bivalve associations of the genera Lithiotis, Cochlearites and Lithioperna that extended all along the Pliensbachian Trento Platform forming mass accumulations of specimens that formed Reef-Like structures. This fauna appeared after the early Pliensbachian C-cycle perturbation, that triggered the diffusion of the Lithiotis Fauna, noted on the rapid widespread of this biota after the event layers. All of the genera related with this fauna appeared on the lower Jurassic, and all but one became extinct before the Middle Jurassic. This "Reefs" had a strong zonation, starting with the bivalves Gervilleioperna and Mytiloperna, restricted to intertidal and shallow-subtidal facies. Lithioperna is limited to  lagoonal subtidal facies and even in some low-oxygen environments. Finally Lithiotis and Cochlearites are found in subtidal facies, constructing buildups. This sections formed various kinds of ecosystems on the Trento platform, where it appeared in branched corals filled with (Spongiomorpha), Domal corals (Stromatoporida), tubular corals, Styllophyllidae corals, unidentified Cerioidea colonial corals, regular echinoid debris, sponges, and the solitary coral Opelismilia sp., with also aggregated snail shells.

Ammonoidea

Gasteropoda

Echinoidea

Thylacocephala

Crustacea

Vertebrata

Chondrichthyes 
Episodic surficial bioturbation is common on the Rotzo Formation,  due to invertebrates or fishes which alter intensely but rapidly the substrate for many cm in depth. It this case the Bioturbation is assigned to mollusc predatory Chondrichthyes, such as Hybodontidae and Heterodontidae. It also resembles  present day flat angel sharks or Squatinidae and Guitarfish such as Rhinobatos.

Actinopterygii  
Unidentified fish scales are known from the formation.

Crocodyliformes

Dinosaurs 
On the Inter-supratidal levels show that on the Rotzo Formation the Tracksites were rarely hit by Storm Waves. Bella Lastra Tracksite recovers this environment, where the shales present (Where Fish & Crocodrylomorph Remains where found) are filled with plant roots, pollen grains, spores, freshwater ostracodes and the bivalve Eomiodon. This was deposited mostly on a Lagoonar environment with abundant shed vegetation. The main local Track record recovers specially Theropoda and Sauropoda, where the Sauropods are the most abundant tracks present (70%), moving the Otozum-like Sauropodomorphs of lower levels, with the climate changing from arid to humid. The Coste dell’Anglone ichnosite is considered as derived from semi-arid tidal flat deposits, due to the abundance of Cheirolepidiaceae Pollen. As the Pliensbachian Trento Platform is considered to be formed by a channelized barrier formed by sand, with reiterate tide emersions. The dinosaurs living here probably trampled on the subtidal flats looking for fishes trapped on tidal-derived ponds.

Flora

The Rotzo Formation was deposited on a Lagoon on the emerged Trento Platform, leading to a well preserved fossil flora record, collected and studied since the 19th century. The great level of floral fossilization has even allow to discovery fossil amber on the Bellori section. This amber has allowed to determine that the environment was a shallow tropical lagoon, only a few metres deep, closed seawards by oolitic shoals and bars. (Cheirolepidiaceae), associated with dry and wet climates in coastal areas. The abundance of this group of conifers is also proven by the high presence of cuticles of Pagiophyllum cf. rotzoanum. Beyond this genera, spores are highly diversified, including from Sphenophyta, Selaginellales to Ferns, with abundance (more than 50%) of trilete spores (Deltoidospora), what suggest a good freshwater availability corresponding  to  a  wet  climate, proven also by the presence of aquatic miospores of algae such as Botryococcus  and Pseudoschizaea. The climate was arid on some seasons with monsoon months. The abundance of marine fauna on this sediments, including fragments  of  corals,  bryozoans,  bivalves, echinoids,  and  foraminifera,  suggest transport  from brackish  lagoons  and  marshes,  probably  occurred  during storm events. Overall data points to a marshy and/or submerged paleoenvironment, comparable to the present-day Taxodium swamp or cypress swamp and a Bahamian-type marine environment in a rather wet monsoonal climate as in the modern southeastern Asia.

Amber

Palynology

Plant remains

See also 
 List of dinosaur-bearing rock formations
 List of stratigraphic units with sauropodomorph tracks
 Prosauropod tracks

Bibliography 

Geologic formations of Italy
Jurassic System of Europe
Jurassic Italy
Pliensbachian Stage
Limestone formations
Lagoonal deposits
Ichnofossiliferous formations
Paleontology in Italy